"Madame Butterfly (un bel dì vedremo)" is a song by Malcolm McLaren, an electronic interpretation of the operatic work. It was released as a single from McLaren's 1984 album Fans, and reached number 13 on the UK Singles Chart.

References

1984 singles
Malcolm McLaren songs
1984 songs
Popular songs based on classical music